NCA may refer to:

Businesses and organisations

Australia
 National Capital Authority, a government authority for development planning of the Capital Territory
 National Crime Authority, defunct investigative agency

European Union
 National Competent Authorities, organisations for banking supervision in each EU member state
National competition authorities, in the context of European Union competition law

India
 Nuclear Command Authority (India)
 National Cricket Academy

Ireland
 National Consumer Agency, a defunct government body
 National Cycling Association, a defunct sports governing body

Norway
 Norwegian Church Aid, a charity
 Norwegian Coastal Administration, a government agency

Pakistan
 National College of Arts, Lahore
 National Command Authority (Pakistan)

United Kingdom
 National Campaign for the Arts, a lobbying group
 National Character Area, a type of region in England
 National Crime Agency, a law-enforcement agency
 The Northern Care Alliance NHS Group, a health-care organisation for Greater Manchester

United States
 National Climate Assessment, a governmental interagency
 National Cheerleaders Association, an organization that holds cheer camps and competitions
 National Coffee Association, a coffee industry body
 National Command Authority (United States), a military doctrine
 National Communication Association, an organization to promote communication studies as a discipline
 National Conservation Area, a class of region managed by the Bureau of Land Management
 North Central Association of Colleges and Schools, one of six organizations that provide higher learning accreditation

Elsewhere
 National Citizens Alliance, federal political party in Canada
 National Computerization Agency, a Korean statutory agency for informatization
 Network of Concerned Anthropologists, an independent ad hoc network of anthropologists seeking to promote an ethical anthropology
 National Conscription Agency, an agency in Taiwan
 New Classical Adventure, a record label for classical music based in Hamburg, Germany
 Nigerian College of Accountancy, training institution in Jos, Nigeria
 Nippon Cargo Airlines, a cargo airline of Japan
 Nuevo Central Argentino, an Argentine railway company

Chemistry
 Amino acid N-carboxyanhydride
 Lithium nickel cobalt aluminium oxides, a group of lithium-ion battery cathode materials

Computing
 Network Computing Architecture (disambiguation)
 Neighbourhood components analysis, a supervised classification technique
 Nexus Computing Agents, trusted software programs in Microsoft's delayed Next-Generation Secure Computing Base initiative
 Nortel Certified Architect, the highest Nortel certifications
 .nca-File ( Nintendo Switch Content Archive- or Nikon Camara Color Adjustment-File)

Law
 Nature Conservation Act 1992, Queensland, Australia
 Noise Control Act, a U.S. law more formally known as the Noise Pollution and Abatement Act of 1972
 Non-compete agreement, an agreement between an employer and employee prohibiting an employee from working for a competitor after separation

Places
 New Caledonia, French overseas territory, UNDP country code
 Nicaragua, by IOC country code
 Urban community of Nice Côte d'Azur, the intercommunal structure gathering the city of Nice, France and some of its suburbs
 Ngorongoro Conservation Area, a protected area and World Heritage Site Arusha, Tanzania
 North Caicos Airport, Turks and Caicos Islands (by IATA code)

Other uses
 Nationwide Ceasefire Agreement, a landmark ceasefire agreement in Myanmar commonly known by its abbreviation
 NC.A (born 1996), Korean singer
 News Channel America, an American television news and entertainment network